The Vane-Fletcher, later Fletcher-Vane Baronetcy, of Hutton-in-the-Forest in the County of Cumberland, was a title in the Baronetage of Great Britain. It was created on 27 June 1786 for Lionel Vane-Fletcher. His son, the second Baronet, was a Member of Parliament for Winchelsea and Carlisle. He assumed the surname of Fletcher-Vane in lieu of Vane-Fletcher. The fifth Baronet was involved in the Scouting movement. The title became extinct on his death in 1934.

The family estates at Hutton-in-the-Forest passed to William Vane, a distant kinsman of the Fletcher-Vane baronets, who took the surname Fletcher-Vane in 1931 and was created Baron Inglewood in 1964. The surname reflects descent from the Fletcher baronets of Hutton, but Inglewood was not a descendant of the Fletcher family, unlike the Fletcher-Vane baronets who were direct descendants.

Vane-Fletcher, later Fletcher-Vane baronets, of Hutton
Sir Lionel Wright Vane-Fletcher, 1st Baronet (1723–1786)
Sir Frederick Fletcher-Vane, 2nd Baronet (1760–1832)
Sir Francis Fletcher-Vane, 3rd Baronet (1767–1842)
Sir Henry Ralph Fletcher-Vane, 4th Baronet (1830–1908)
Sir Francis Patrick Fletcher Vane, 5th Baronet (1861–1934)

References

Extinct baronetcies in the Baronetage of Great Britain